Dollard-Des Ormeaux–Roxboro is a former borough in the West Island area of Montreal, Quebec. It was composed of the former municipalities of Dollard-des-Ormeaux and Roxboro, and was formed on January 1, 2002.

On June 20, 2004, Dollard-Des Ormeaux voted to return to being an independent municipality, effective January 1, 2006. Roxboro elected to stay part of Montreal, although this result is being challenged in court. It was incorporated into the new borough of Pierrefonds—Roxboro.

Geography
The borough was located in the northeastern part of the West Island. It was bounded to the north by Pierrefonds—Senneville, to the southeast by Saint-Laurent, to the south by Dorval—L'Île-Dorval, to the southwest by Pointe-Claire, and to the west by Kirkland.

The northern part of Roxboro had two salients that reach the bank of the Rivière des Prairies, exclaving two sections of Pierrefonds—Senneville.

The borough had an area of 17,30 km2 and a population of 53,848.

See also
 List of former boroughs
 Montreal Merger
 Municipal reorganization in Quebec

Former Montreal boroughs
Dollard-des-Ormeaux

fr:Dollard-Des Ormeaux–Roxboro